Balkumari College is an educational institution of higher learning, located in Narayangarh, Chitwan, Nepal. It was established on 18 September 1986. Balkumari College is affiliated to Tribhuwan University for bachelor's degree and to NEB for 11 & 12 grade.

Courses offered 
 10+2 in Science, Management, Hotel Management, ICTE in Education, Education, Humanities Stream (Higher Secondary Education Board (HSEB), Sano Thimi, Nepal)
 Bachlelor in Science in Microbiology, Bachelor in Environmental Science, Bachelor in Hotel Management, Bachelor in Information Management, Bachelor in Business Studies, Bachelor in Education, Bachelor in Education Information Communication Technology, Bachelor in Business Administration
 Master in Business Studies(MBS) & Master in Education (M.Ed.)
 
Health Programs: Staff Nurse, CMA and ANM

Affiliations and Partners 
 Tribhuvan University
 World Bank
 University Grants Commission, Sanothimi, Bhaktapur
 Peacecrops Nepal
 Chaudhary Group of Industries
 Lions Clubs International
 Gonoshasthaya Kendra, Savar, Bangladesh
 Nepal Family Health Project
 State University of Bangladesh, Dhaka
 Califonrnia State University, Fullerton
 State University of Calif, San Bernardino
 PUM (ex experts’ team of the Netherlands, the Hague)
 Mumbai University, Mumbai, India
 Delhi University, New Delhi
 Pune University, Pune, India
 Goa University, Goa, India
 Microbiologist's Society, India
 Winrock International, VTA program, (Farmer to Farmer)
 American Center, Kathmandu
 Narayangarh Chamber of Commerce & Industries
 PHD Chamber of Commerce and Industry, New Delhi, India
 Research Division, Tribhuvan University
 Family Planning Association of Nepal
 love Green Nepal, Nara Devi, Kathmandu, Nepal
 Nepal AOTS Alumni Society, Kathmandu, Nepal

References

Educational institutions established in 1986
1986 establishments in Nepal